Mmakau is a village in Bojanala District Municipality in the North West province of South Africa. It is located about 12 km to the east of Brits, and 40 kilometres north-west of Pretoria. It is home to the Bakgatla ba Mmakau tribal authority under the leadership of the Motsepe family.

Schools 
Polonia Primary School
Mmakau Moemise Primary School
Tlhopane Primary School
Sekwati Primary School
Tsogo Secondary School
Malatse Motsepe Secondary School

References

Populated places in the Madibeng Local Municipality